Angelo Maria Dolci (12 July 1867 – 13 September 1939) was an Italian prelate of the Catholic Church who was made a cardinal in 1933. He was Bishop of Gubbio from 1900 to 1906, Archbishop of Amalfi from 1911 to 1914, and Apostolic Vicar of Constantinople from 1914 to 1922. He also served in the diplomatic corps of the Holy See as an Apostolic Delegate or Apostolic Nuncio from 1906 to 1910 and from 1914 to 1933.

Biography 
Dolci was born in Civitella d'Agliano on 12 July 1867 and was ordained a priest on 5 June 1890. In preparation for a career in the diplomatic service he entered the Pontifical Ecclesiastical Academy in 1892. 

Pope Leo XIII appointed him bishop of Gubbio on 19 April 1900. He was named apostolic delegate in Ecuador, Bolivia, and Peru on 7 December 1906. He was promoted to titular archbishop of Nazianzo on 9 December 1906. He was recalled to Rome in 1910. 

He was appointed Archbishop of Amalfi on 27 January 1911. He was appointed Apostolic Delegate and vicar apostolic of Constantinople on 10 June 1914. His assignment to the titular archdiocese of Gerapoli followed on 16 November 1914.

On 14 December 1922 he was appointed as Apostolic Nuncio to Belgium, however, he could not take possession of the nunciature and was named Nuncio to Romania on 30 May 1923.

He was created Cardinal-Priest of Santa Maria della Vittoria, Rome by Pope Pius XI in the consistory of 13 March 1933. He was appointed Archpriest of the Basilica of Saint Mary Major on 22 May 1933. He was elected to the order of cardinal bishops, taking the suburbicarian see of Palestrina 15 June 1936. He participated in the conclave of 1939 that elected Pope Pius XII. He died in September of that year.

Armenian genocide
In 1915, as Apostolic Delegate to Constantinople (1914–1922), Archbishop Dolci wrote to Mehmed V and Talaat Pasha to ask for mercy on behalf of the Armenians, who were then being deported and massacred. Dolci reported back to the Vatican to Pope Benedict XV and his secretary of foreign affairs Eugenio Pacelli, the future Pope Pius XII. He admitted he had been deceived by the Turks, because despite giving contrary assurances to the Holy See delegate, they continued to massacre the Armenians. 

He died at his home in Civitella d'Agliano on 13 September 1939.

References

Further reading

1867 births
1939 deaths
Pontifical Ecclesiastical Academy alumni
20th-century Italian cardinals
Apostolic Nuncios to Belgium
Cardinal-bishops of Palestrina
Apostolic Nuncios to Bolivia
Apostolic Nuncios to Ecuador
Apostolic Nuncios to Romania
20th-century Italian Roman Catholic bishops